Haut-Ogooué is the southeasternmost of Gabon's nine provinces. It is named after the Ogooué River. The provincial capital is Franceville. One of its primary industries is mining, with manganese, gold and uranium being found in the region. The uranium-bearing mineral francevillite takes its name from the primary city. It is the historical home of three cultures, the Obamba, Ndzebi and Téké. Like many regions in Africa, more traditional uses of the land have given way to rural migration to the larger cities. In August 2006, its soccer club won the Gabon Independence Cup.

To the northeast, east, and south, Haut-Ogooué borders several regions of the Republic of the Congo:

 Cuvette-Ouest – northeast
 Cuvette – east
 Plateaux – southeast
 Lékoumou – south
 Niari – southwest

Domestically, it borders the following provinces:

 Ogooué-Lolo – west
 Ogooué-Ivindo – north

Departments

Haut-Ogooué is divided into eight departments:

 Djoue (Onga)
 Djououri-Aguilli (Bongoville)
 Lekoni-Lekori (Akiéni)
 Lekoko (Bakoumba)
 Lemboumbi-Leyou (Moanda)
 Mpassa (Franceville)
 Plateaux (Lékoni)
 Sebe-Brikolo (Okondja)

References

 
Provinces of Gabon